Francisco José ("Paco") Lara Ruiz (born February 25, 1977 in Granada) is a Spanish professional road bicycle racer, currently without a team.

Palmarès 

 1999
 1st, Overall, Memorial Valenciaga
 2000
 1st, Overall, Vuelta a Cartagena
2004
 3rd, Spanish national road championships

External links 

Spanish male cyclists
1977 births
Living people
Sportspeople from Granada
Cyclists from Andalusia